Karl Mattias Lindström (born 18 April 1980) is a Swedish former professional footballer who played as a midfielder. He is the manager of Helsingborgs IF

Club career
Lindström played for SV Mattersburg from June 2008 to March 2009 before his contract was terminated. Thereafter, Lindström signed with GAIS. He joined Innsbruck in 2008, signing from Aalborg Boldspilklub of the Danish Superliga championship. Before moving to Denmark, Lindström played eight seasons for Swedish team Helsingborgs IF, for whom he debuted in 1997. In January 2010, he returned to his youthclub Helsingborgs IF and signed a three-year contract. In 2013, he managed to score in all of the first 6 rounds of Allsvenskan - a new all-time record for Allsvenskan.

International career
Lindström played three times for the Sweden national football team. He was part of the Sweden team that won the 2003 King's Cup.

References

External links
AaB profile
Career stats at Danmarks Radio

1980 births
AaB Fodbold players
Danish Superliga players
Allsvenskan players
Austrian Football Bundesliga players
Swedish expatriate footballers
Expatriate footballers in Austria
Expatriate men's footballers in Denmark
FC Wacker Innsbruck (2002) players
Helsingborgs IF players
Living people
Sportspeople from Helsingborg
SV Mattersburg players
Sweden international footballers
Sweden under-21 international footballers
Swedish footballers
Association football midfielders
Swedish expatriate sportspeople in Denmark
Swedish expatriate sportspeople in Austria